Steinbruch Eckartsberg is a lake in Saxony, Germany. At an elevation of 280 m, its surface area is 0.6 ha.

Lakes of Saxony